The 2013 FIM Moto2 World Championship was a part of the 65th F.I.M. Road Racing World Championship season. Marc Márquez was the reigning champion, but did not contest in season as he joined the MotoGP with Repsol Honda.

Season summary
Pol Espargaró became champion in the class, after overhauling Scott Redding towards the end of the season. With six race victories, Espargaró won the championship by 40 points ahead of Redding, who won three races, with third place going to Esteve Rabat, a three-time race winner. Nicolás Terol, who finished seventh, was another three-time race winner, with other victories taken by Mika Kallio (fourth) and Jordi Torres, who was tenth in the championship. In the constructors' championship, Kalex won thirteen of the seventeen races to win the title by almost 100 points from Suter, who won the other four races.

The following Grands Prix were scheduled to take place in 2013:

Calendar
The following Grands Prix were scheduled to take place in 2013:

The Fédération Internationale de Motocyclisme released a 18-race provisional calendar on 19 September 2012. On 23 November 2012, the calendar was updated following confirmation that the return of the Argentine Grand Prix would be postponed to 2014. The Grand Prix of the Americas held at the Circuit of the Americas in Austin, United States, replaced the Portuguese Grand Prix, which had been run at Estoril since 2000. The United States hosted two races, the other being the Indianapolis Grand Prix at the Indianapolis Motor Speedway.

 ‡ = Night race
 †† = Saturday race

Calendar changes
 The Grand Prix of the Americas was added to the calendar.
 The Portuguese Grand Prix was taken off the calendar. The race was scheduled on the calendar since 2000.
 The British Grand Prix was moved back, from 17 June to 1 September.
 The Japanese Grand Prix was moved back, from 14 to 27 October.

Teams and riders
 A provisional entry list was released by the Fédération Internationale de Motocyclisme on 28 November 2012. An updated entry list was released on 12 February 2013. All Moto2 competitors raced with an identical CBR600RR inline-four engine developed by Honda. Teams competed with tyres supplied by Dunlop.

Rider changes 

 Sandro Cortese moved up from Moto3 to the newly established Intact GP team, on a two-year deal.
 Randy Krummenacher switched from GP Team Switzerland to Technomag-CIP within Moto2 for 2013.
 Louis Rossi and Danny Kent raced for Tech 3 Racing's Moto2 bikes in 2013, having both moved up from Moto3.

Results and standings

Grands Prix

Riders' standings
Scoring system
Points were awarded to the top fifteen finishers. A rider had to finish the race to earn points.

Constructors' standings
Points were awarded to the top fifteen finishers. A rider had to finish the race to earn points.

 Each constructor got the same number of points as their best placed rider in each race.

References

Moto2
Grand Prix motorcycle racing seasons